Clarno is an unincorporated community in Wasco County, Oregon, United States. It is located along Oregon Route 218 near the John Day River.

History

The community was named after Andrew Clarno, an early settler. The Clarno post office was established in 1894 in what was then Gilliam County, from which Wheeler County was later carved. After that, the post office was sometimes in Wheeler County, on the east side of the river, or in Wasco County, on the west side, depending on who was postmaster. The office closed in 1949.

Charles Clarno, Andrew's son, built a miniature steamboat, The John Day Queen, used as a ferry and for pleasure trips. After a bridge was constructed at Clarno in 1897, the younger Clarno decided to float the boat down the John Day River to the Columbia River and then down the Columbia to Portland.. The attempt ended in failure at Clarno Rapids, slightly beyond where the boat normally traveled. There The John Day Queen broke free from guide ropes held by Charles Clarno and his friends and smashed on the rocks downstream. The spark arrestor from the boat was later rescued and donated to the city museum in Fossil.

Parks and recreation
For whitewater enthusiasts, the long and complicated Clarno Rapids is rated at class 3 (difficult) on the International Scale of River Difficulty or class 4 (very difficult) in high water.

Notes and references
Notes

References

Unincorporated communities in Wasco County, Oregon
1894 establishments in Oregon
Populated places established in 1894
Unincorporated communities in Oregon